High on Life is a comedic first-person shooter game with action-adventure and Metroidvania elements. It takes place in a science fiction world which features talking guns. It was created by Justin Roiland and developed and published by Squanch Games. The game was released on December 13, 2022 for Windows, Xbox One and Xbox Series X/S. The game received mixed reviews from critics, who were divided on its humour, while criticising the technical issues upon launch.

Gameplay
High on Life is a first-person shooter video game with action-adventure and metroidvania elements. Players are tasked with assassinating select targets, and must fight their way into the target's lair and then fight the targets in a boss battle.

Players attack using living alien weapons, five living guns called "Gatlians" and one sentient knife. The guns have primary, alternate, and special "trick hole" firing modes that can be used in combat. The knife has an additional grapple ability that allows players to use ziplines to move around the world.  Weapon specials are also used to solve puzzles and gain access to certain areas in non-combat scenarios.

Players can gain abilities and upgrade their existing abilities by purchasing upgrades at shops or by finding them in chests. As players get new Gatlians and other equipment it is possible to access previously unreachable areas, as in a Metroidvania.

In addition to combat, players encounter traversal and platforming sections, as well as puzzles that are solved using the Gatlians' weapon abilities, and social areas where players can interact with non-player characters.

Plot
The player character and their sister Lizzie have the house to themselves while their parents go away on a trip. While going out to get supplies for a wild party Lizzie plans to throw, an alien craft appears. Hiding behind a parked car, the player character and Lizzie witness one of the aliens killing their neighbor while another is suddenly killed by his allies. The player investigates the body of the dead alien and finds a smaller looking alien in its jacket before being spit on by it which allows them to communicate with each other. Introducing himself as the Gatlian Kenny, he reveals to the player that their planet is being invaded by Garmantuous and the G3 Cartel which plans to turn the entire human race into drugs. To avoid being captured, the player and Kenny work together to escape Earth and warps their house to Blim City.

Needing help to fight the G3, Kenny tasks the player to find and hire the famous bounty hunter Gene Zaroothian. While they are able to find Gene, they discover that he has become a crippled, homeless bum. Initially not interested in helping out the player character, Gene changes his mind when he offers to make the player a bounty hunter in exchange for their house if they die. Now known as the Bounty Hunter, Gene gives them his old bounty hunter suit and sets up a Bounty 5000 in the house before tasking them with retrieving his old knife, Knifey from a G3 mercenary known as 9-Torg.

The player character is tasked to travel through the Blim City slums in order to find and kill 9-Torg in her hideout within the sewage plant. The player encounters members of 9-Torg’s gang as they fight their way through, learning more about Kenny’s capabilities, such as an ability known as the glob shot which allows the player to shoot globs of goo at enemies and objects to solve puzzles and deal additional damage. Eventually, the player finds 9-Torg and defeats her. Afterward, the player character is tasked with locating and killing the respective leaders of the G3, including Garmantuous himself, in order to liberate Earth from the cartel.

The first two leaders the player is sent to kill include Douglas, a sadistic, torture-obsessed pathological liar whom is tasked with training new members of the G3, and Krubis, a jittery, trigger-happy addict who is tasked with enslaving a village of the teddy bear-like Moplets to mine for Furgles, another species harvested to be used as drugs.  Both Douglas and Krubis have other captured Gatlians in their possession, including a rapid-fire female Gatlian named Sweezy, whose ability to create time bubbles can slow down time for whoever or whatever is trapped inside one, and a three-shot shotgun-based Gatlian named Gus, whose ability is to shoot large razer blades that can stick to walls.  After the player manages to kill both Douglas and Krubis, they and Kenny rescue Sweezy and Gus and recruit them to their team.

With both bounties dead, Gene invites the player to watch a news bulletin by Blim City's Magistrate Clugg Nuggin, who publicly praises the player's actions in their fight against the G3, and asks the bounty hunter to join forces with him and Blim City.  At Gene's recommendation, the player accepts the offer and meets up with Clugg in his office, where he reveals his knowledge of the player being human, and their survival of the G3's invasion.  He asks the player to help him fight the G3 in exchange for a special device that will help them find and rescue imprisoned humans, and teleport them to a safe haven created by Clugg to provide humans sanctuary until the G3 are stopped.  As thanks for agreeing to help, Clugg has his forces send all vital intelligence on the G3 to Gene, who recommends the player buy a jetpack upgrade for their suit upon returning.

The upgrade arrives several days later, which the player tests by flying across buildings.  Meanwhile, at home, Lizzie has been getting into constant arguments with Gene, and has also started dating an alien boyfriend name Tweeg, who Gene clearly dislikes.  After helping them determine which one is right during an intense argument, Gene informs the player that the intel sent by Clugg is finally paying off with two new bounties.  

One of the two new bounties is the Skrendel Bros, who have enslaved the Moplets again for the G3 and have captured another Gatlian named Creature.  They also find a scientific analysis on another Gatlian named Lezduit, whom Kenny seems to personally recognize.  Creature, who had been brutally tortured by the G3's numerous experiments, helps the player escape with his ability to asexually reproduce smaller aliens with microscopic lifespans, which they use to sabotage machinery.  The player then dispatches the Skrendel Bros, Jonathan, Angela, and Mona, who eventually form a tower of each other they name 'Bro-Tron', but are all killed by the player.  After this is done, Garmantuous personally contacts the player, and warns them that he now has 'two very important people' in his custody, which the player and Gatlians all deduce must be the player's parents, and taunts the player with the promise that he is going to kill them after making them suffer.  He also reveals that he has set up a new base on earth, which is inaccessible without the right coordinates.

After returning home, Gene talks to the player about fixing up some old bounty ads to attract more customers, and the player meets Lizzie's alien boyfriend Tweeg, who they can either allow to keep dating Lizzie, or follow Gene's advice and demand that he stop seeing her. Regardless, this leads to another argument between Gene and Lizze, the latter of which has become increasingly upset with the former living on their couch.

Lizzie then departs, and Gene informs the player that despite their growing list of firepower, they're still not ready to face Garmantuous.  Gene then tells the player that Clugg's data has revealed the existence of an extremely powerful Gatlian in the possession of Dr. Jon Giblets, who the player must find with their suit's (utterly useless) detective mode.  After eventually gaining a lead towards a new store called 'High on Life', which is located in the slums, the player meets two aliens that threaten them before teleporting away, and then steal a pair of magnetic boots off the corpse of an alien accidentally trampled to death by people looking to enter the store.  The player uses them to escape the slums after suddenly getting attacked, and return home to find the same aliens from before, now revealed to be Clugg's sons, who inform the player that the remains of the Torg family got mixed up with Giblets, who they now have a lead on.  They then take the player back to Clugg, who hesitantly asks for help in his upcoming election by getting rid of Giblets.  Clugg provides them with map data to find Giblets, provided that his involvement in the matter stays secret.

With this new data, the player teleports to Giblets' lab, where they find Giblets had murdered his own G3 staff to do experiments on them.  The weapon Giblets used to attack his men turns out to be the previously mentioned Gatlian, now revealed to be a famous and powerful Gatlian named Lezduit, now catatonic and inoperable due to intense experimentation by Dr. Giblets.  The player recovers them for Gene to examine later, and finds Giblets, who accidentally slips and falls, and therefore kills himself.  The player then deals with Giblets' failsafe security before departing.

The player returns to Gene and gives Lezduit to him in order to see if he can be salvaged, but then Gene informs them that Lizzie has gone missing, and is asked to find her.  Suspecting Tweeg may somehow be involved in her disappearance, Gene directs them to the Space Applebee's down in the slums.  Before departing, however, Kenny suddenly asks the player to leave all the other Gatlians with Gene, clearly nervous about something he wants to tell the player.  Upon arriving at Applebees, Kenny and the player take a seat after failing to find Tweeg, and Kenny reveals that he is actually the one who is responsible for the destruction of his home planet Gatlus.  

Kenny explains to the player that Gatlus was once an isolated planet on the far edge of an asteroid belt, completely unknown to the wider galaxy just like earth once was.  One day, an alien smuggler named Rel Delmar crash-landed on the planet.  Kenny, wanting to leave the planet due to his people constantly calling him a failure, decided to help Rel fix his ship and then go with him, finally getting the chance to achieve his dream of seeing outer space and having great adventures.  Unfortunately, Rel being a smuggler caused several run-ins with several shady characters, and eventually met up with the G3 and Garmantuous, who immediately became fascinated with Kenny's abilities of unlimited firepower, and tricked him into revealing the existence of Gatlus.  Garmantuous led the G3 in an invasion of the planet, but were pushed back in a rebellion led by Lezduit.  Garmantuous attacked again however with a powerful super-virus that zombified most of the Gatlians, and a remorseful Kenny told Lezduit of his involvement in the invasion before seemingly dying, not knowing that Lezduit would survive.  Kenny admits he is now scared that he will have to tell the other Gatlians what he did, but just as he finishes his story, they spot Tweeg and Liz outside.  Depending on the player's earlier choices, this will either be Lizzie running off with Tweeg to start a new life (in which the G3 will have learned about the bounty hunter through Gene's bounty hunting ads), or Tweeg would be selling out the player to the G3 for money and then kidnapping Lizzie for more money.  Either way, they disappear into Tweeg's space rv before the G3 suddenly attack the player, despite being in the neutral Blim City.  They flee back to the house and teleport away to specific coordinates under Kenny's instructions.  They end up teleporting to Gatlus, now left a toxic wasteland thanks to the G3, and Kenny warns that if they don't stop the G3, earth will end up exactly the same.

The next day, Gene summons everyone to discuss their next move, and provides the player extra over-shield for their bounty hunting suit. Gene reveals that he has tracked Lizzie's bio-signal, and sends the player to bring her back.  Depending on the previous choices, Lizzie will either break up with Tweeg if their relationship turns out to not be going anywhere or will have outright killed him if he tried to kidnap her.  Upon returning, Clugg sends the team data on Nipulon, one of Garmantuous' top lieutenants, as well as the promise that Lezduit will be fixed by the time the player gets back.  Upon hearing this, Kenny decides to tell the other Gatlians what he did, shunning himself from the rest of the group as they now resent him for causing the destruction of their home and people.

Despite agreeing to track down and kill Nepulon at his drug lounge, the other Gatlians decide to abandon Kenny once the G3 are dealt with.  During the hunt for Nepulon, Kenny constantly tries to make amends with the others, but only Creature seems willing to hear him out.  After managing to blend in with the G3 and invade their lounge undercover, the player is sent into a fit of violent rage after seeing how the G3 mistreat the other humans and slaughter their way to Nipulon's office.  Nipulon fights the player and sends them into a drug-induced hallucination, during which the player battles and defeats their own personal insecurities and helps the Gatlians reconcile with Kenny, allowing them to fight and defeat Nipulon together.

With Nipulon now dead, the player and the Gatlians steal the earth coordinates off Nipulon's computer and return home, where Gene and Lizzie are now less hostile with each other and finally finish repairing Lezduit.  Despite his speech functions having been limited to only saying his name, Lezduit remains otherwise fully functional, and joins the player in their fight to reclaim earth, which is now a wasteland similar to Gatlus.  Before departing, however, Gene provides the player with one final thing; a remote atomizer bomb, which can be used on Garmantuous and his hardened skin as a last resort, before he and Lizzie warp off-planet for their own safety.

After fighting their way to Garmantuous, the player engages him in a final battle, and manages to immobilize him long enough to plant the atomizer bomb into his anus.  Unfortunately, the bomb's remote detonater doesn't work, and Garmantuous recovers and temporarily captures the player, presenting them with the two people he captured, now revealed to not actually be the player's parents, but Jack Black and Susan Sarandon.  Upon realizing that the player doesn't actually love either of them, Garmantuous kills them both and fights the player again, only to be defeated a second time.  Realizing that there is only one way to finish him off for good, Kenny volunteers to let himself be sacrificed by detonating the bomb manually.

Regardless of whether or not the player chooses Kenny, or any other of the Gatlians acquired throughout their journey, Garmantuous is blown up, and the Gatlian used to kill him survives mostly unscathed, saving the planet from the G3.

In the game's secret ending, the player visits the human sanctuary, and finds a secret room where it turns out Clugg has been secretly experimenting on humans within the sanctuary.  The player chases Clugg to another secret room occupied by Dr. Gurgula, who executes Clugg and reveals himself to be the scientist responsible for the virus that zombified Gatlus, having believed that Gatlians were the key to some sort of next step in organic evolution, but now believes the key to be within humans.  Gurgula then departs, setting up possible sequel bait, and the player is confronted by Clugg's sons, who claim to have never liked their father and promise to look after the rescued humans better than their father did.  The player decides to believe them and then leaves.

Development
Development of High on Life began in 2019, a short time after the release of the studio's previous title, Trover Saves the Universe. The initial concept, conceived by Justin Roiland, was to develop a first-person shooter that featured talking guns that would speak to the player and react to their actions. 

The original High on Life trailer was released at the Xbox and Bethesda Games Showcase on June 12, 2022, with an anticipated release of October 2022. A two-month delay was announced on August 18, 2022, however that set the release date to December 13, 2022, with the stated reason being to finish improving the game.

Original music was composed by Tobacco with additional music provided by Morris Borris, Ryan Elder, Sam Houselander, Pete Maguire, Jonathan Peros, Kevin Temmer and Akash Thakkar.

Justin Roiland was heavily involved in the creation of High on Life. He has received credit for creating the original concept of the game and taking part in the design and development of it. Design director Erich Mayr has described the style of the game to be "Blade Runner meets The Muppets".

Reception 

High on Life received "mixed or average reviews", according to review aggregator Metacritic. The game's crude and absurdist humor proved polarizing. In a positive review, IGN called it "an irreverent, absurd shooter that manages to shine with its outrageous humor, silly setting and story", while Eurogamer criticized that the writing "too often settles into edgelord cynicism and the same tedious, punchdown humour as South Park." The Guardian noted that "the line between entertaining and excruciating here is down to how you feel about listening to a game-length version of Rick and Mortys Interdimensional Cable ad-libs". 

Reviewers also noted that the game suffered from a number of technical issues. Squanch Games released a day-one patch addressing these bugs, along with a second patch on December 16, 2022.

Sales 
High on Life was the most played title on Xbox Game Pass during the week of its release, and was the fourth most played title on the Xbox platform overall, and was hailed as a "breakout hit" by Xbox VP of Marketing Aaron Greenberg. It also became the top selling game on Steam.

References

External links
 

2022 video games
Action-adventure games
Comedy games
First-person shooters
Metroidvania games
Science fiction video games
Indie video games
Single-player video games
Video games about extraterrestrial life
Video games developed in the United States
Video games set on fictional planets
Windows games
Xbox One games
Xbox Series X and Series S games
Squanch Games games